Gorbaciof is a 2010 Italian drama film directed by Stefano Incerti. It premiered out of competition at the 67th Venice International Film Festival.

Plot 
Marino Pacileo is a solitary man living in the Vasto area of Naples, a multiethnic suburb close to the train station. He is nicknamed "Gorbaciof" as, like the Soviet leader, has a port-wine stain on his forehead. He is a cashier in the prison at Poggioreale, using his job as a means of funding his gambling addiction. He plays poker in a makeshift gambling house at the back of a Chinese restaurant, and here he meets Lila, daughter of the restaurant's owner. Gorbaciof is fascinated by Lila, whom he starts stalking; and Lila finds herself attracted to this strange man who rescued her from two violent teenagers. In spite of the language barrier (Lila doesn't speak Italian), they start seeing each other.

Gorbaciof gives the girl's father a large sum of money in order for him to pay off his debts, thus avoiding Lila becoming a prostitute. However, a bad hand at poker has Gorbaciof owing a large sum of money to a corrupt lawyer and he is forced to ask a prison guard for a loan. The guard asks Gorbaciof to provide him with several illegal services, in exchange for the money. Gorbaciof then plans to leave Naples with Lila, but needs to complete a dangerous assignment first: be a lookout during a risky robbery.

The robbery goes well and Gorbaciof manages to escape, along with two other accomplices, but they are soon followed by the gun-wielding cashier. While everyone in the car is rejoicing, tragedy happens: one of the accomplices' two gun accidentally fires a shot, which mortally wounds Gorbaciof. Here we are shown parallel scenes of Gorbaciof dying and Lila waiting for him at the airport. The movie ends with the last things Gorbaciof sees: Naples' buildings that fly past him, as the car speeds through traffic.

Cast 

Toni Servillo: Gorbaciof
Yang Mi: Lila
Salvatore Ruocco : Guard
Nello Mascia: Vanacore  
Geppy Gleijeses: the lawyer

See also
Movies about immigration to Italy

References

External links

2010 films
Italian drama films
2010 drama films
2010s Italian films